In Dreams: The Greatest Hits is a two-record album set by Roy Orbison songs released in 1987 on Virgin Records. It was produced by Orbison and Mike Utley, except for the song "In Dreams", produced by Orbison with T-Bone Burnett and film director David Lynch. All songs are re-recordings by Orbison from 1986, except "In Dreams" from April 1987.

The original 1960s versions of these songs were hit records for Orbison when recorded on Monument Records from 1960 to 1964, with two exceptions. The first exception, "Ooby Dooby", was a hit for Orbison on Sun Records in 1956. "Claudette", the second exception, was a song Orbison wrote that became a hit for the Everly Brothers in 1958. Orbison didn't record the latter exception until he had signed with MGM Records in 1965, a few months after he had divorced his wife Claudette, who had inspired the song. (They later reconciled and remarried in 1966, before her death in a motorcycle accident).

The album contains four songs named by Rolling Stone in 2004 on its list of the "500 Greatest Songs of All Time".

History
In January 1986, Roy Orbison re-recorded 19 of his greatest hits as a gift to his fans. The master tapes of the original recordings were being legally held by Monument Records after the label went bankrupt in the late 1970s. Many of Orbison’s famous songs were not available to consumers for a few years and there was a threat to destroy the tapes if disputes were not resolved.  Fearing his famous songs would be lost forever, Orbison stepped into the studio and performed them once again. According to The Authorized Roy Orbison, these recordings were first released on the Silver Eagle LP The Great Roy Orbison in 1986, and then given to Virgin Records becoming Orbison's first release with his new label, In Dreams: The Greatest Hits, in 1987. The Virgin reissue featured a new version of the song In Dreams especially re-recorded following the success of the movie Blue Velvet.

Fortunately, all of Orbison's Monument master recordings were not destroyed, and like the rest of the Monument catalogue, they are presently owned by Sony Music Entertainment.

Track listing

Side one
"Only the Lonely" (Roy Orbison, Joe Melson) 2:25
"Leah" (Orbison) 2:43
"In Dreams" (Orbison) 2:51
"Uptown" (Orbison, Melson) 2:11
"It's Over" (Orbison, Bill Dees) 2:49

Side two
"Crying" (Orbison, Melson) 2:46
"Dream Baby" (Cindy Walker) 2:35
"Blue Angel" (Orbison, Melson) 2:50
"Working for the Man" (Orbison) 2:49
"Candy Man" (Beverly Ross, Fred Neil) 2:50

Side three
"Running Scared" (Orbison, Melson) 2:11
"Falling" (Orbison) 2:22
"I'm Hurtin'" (Orbison, Melson) 2:43
"Claudette" (Orbison) 2:33

Side four
"Oh, Pretty Woman" (Orbison, Dees) 2:59
"Mean Woman Blues" (Claude Demetrius) 2:27
"Ooby Dooby" (Wade Moore, Dick Penner) 2:22
"Lana" (Orbison, Melson) 2:50
"Blue Bayou" (Orbison, Melson) 2:51

Executive Producer: Barbara Orbison

Personnel
 Adapted from AllMusic:
 Roy Orbison – lead vocals, acoustic rhythm guitar, lead guitar on "Ooby Dooby"
 Dean Parks – lead guitar
 Dennis Belfield – bass
 Robert Irving III – synthesizer
 Michael Utley – keyboards
 Paul Leim – drums
 Tommy Morgan – harmonica
 Sid Page – strings
 David Woodford – saxophone
 Joe Chemay, Rita Coolidge, Linda Dillard, Jim Haas Jon Joyce, Gene Morford, Carole Parks – backing vocals

References

External links
https://web.archive.org/web/20050903230153/http://www.discographyguide.com/royorbison/royorbison-discography1020.html

1987 albums
Roy Orbison albums
Albums produced by Michael Utley
Albums produced by T Bone Burnett
Albums produced by Roy Orbison
Albums produced by David Lynch
Virgin Records albums